Bojan Krasić (born 4 January 1983) is a Serbian football defender. He is the older brother of Miloš Krasić.

References

External links
 
 Bojan Krasić stats at utakmica.rs

1983 births
Living people
Sportspeople from Mitrovica, Kosovo
Association football defenders
Serbian footballers
FK Vojvodina players
FK Mladost Gacko players
FK Radnički Obrenovac players
FK ČSK Čelarevo players
FK Banat Zrenjanin players
FK Proleter Novi Sad players
FK Inđija players
Serbian SuperLiga players